The Digor (Digor dialect: Дигорон - Digoron, pl.: Дигорӕ, Дигорӕнттӕ - Digoræ, Digorænttæ) are a subgroup of the Ossetians. They speak the Digor dialect of the Eastern Iranian Ossetian language, which in USSR was considered a separate language until 1937. Starting from 1932 it is considered just a dialect of Ossetian language. The speakers of the other dialect - Iron - do not understand Digor, although the Digor usually understand Iron, as it was the official language of the Ossetian people and officially taught in schools. In the 2002 Russian Census 607 Digors were registered, but in the 2010 Russian Census their number was only 223. It was estimated that there are 100,000 speakers of the dialect, most of whom declared themselves Ossetians. The Digor mainly live in Digorsky, Irafsky, Mozdoksky districts and Vladikavkaz, North Ossetia–Alania, also in Kabardino-Balkaria, Turkey and Syria.

Name 
Scholars generally link the root dig- with the Circassian endonym A-dyg-e, where the suffix -or could be a mark of plurality as found in many contemporary Caucasian languages. This point of view was criticized by R. Bielmeier and D. Bekoev, they raised the ethnonym to "tygwyr" in the Iron dialect, meaning "gathering, gathering, group."

History 

The early medieval Ashkharatsuyts makes mention of the "nation of the Ash-Tigor Alans" (azg Alanac' Aš-Tigor), or simply the "Dikor nation" (Dik'ori-n), which is generally regarded as an early reference to the Digor. This fact, and other linguistic considerations, have led scholars to believe that Digor dialect became separated from Proto-Ossetian during the Mongol conquests.

The Digors were converted to Sunni Islam in the 17–18th centuries, under the influence of the neighboring Kabarday people who introduced Islam to them. Starting from the 18th century, the ethnonym digor became widely used by travelers and in Russian official documents. Digoria was annexed to the Russian Empire quite late compared to the rest of Ossetia. In the second half of the 19th century, large numbers of Muslim Digors emigrated to the Ottoman Empire.

During World War II, North Ossetia–Alania was occupied by German armies in 1942. After the Germans were forced out of the region, the Muslim Digors, like other Muslim peoples, were accused of Collaboration with the Germans and deported to Central Asia. Estimates say 50% of the Digors died during deportation. Their reputation was rehabilitated in the mid-1950s, and they were allowed to return to their homelands.

Demographics 
Digors make the majority of the Ossetians in Digoria, the western part of the North Ossetia–Alania (Digorsky and Irafsky districts), and in Kabardino-Balkaria.

See also 
 Ossetians
 North Ossetia–Alania
 Digor (dialect)
 Jassic (dialect)

Sources
Wixman. The Peoples of the USSR, p. 58

References

Ossetian people
Peoples of the Caucasus
Ethnic groups in Russia
Muslim communities of Russia
Muslim communities of the Caucasus